Patricia "Pat" Montandon (born December 26, 1928) is an American author and self-made socialite.

Early life
Pat Montandon was born on December 26, 1928. Her parents were Charles Clay Montandon, an itinerant Nazarene Church Texas minister, and his wife Myrtle Taylor. Montandon grew up in Oklahoma during the Great Depression and lived in San Francisco in the 1960s. During this time, she became known for her talent for hosting memorable parties. She is also known for her relationship with Frank Sinatra.

Roundtable Luncheons

In the 1970s, Montandon began hosting the Roundtable luncheons. These luncheons include discussions of controversial topics by Montandon and her guests and are currently ongoing. In the past, they drew figures like Andy Warhol, Danielle Steel, and Frank Sinatra.

Career
In 1960, Montandon moved to San Francisco, where she hosted a TV show and became a newspaper columnist for the San Francisco Examiner after a summer of managing a Joseph Magnin clothing store.

In 1979, Montandon created the idea for the Napa Valley Wine Auction. She lent her idea to the Napa Valley vintners, with her portion of the proceeds benefiting two Napa Valley hospitals.

Montandon is also the author of numerous non-fiction books, including The New York Times bestseller How to Be a Party Girl, The Intruders, Whispers from God: A Life Beyond Imaginings, and Oh the Hell of it All. Additionally, she wrote a book called "Celebrities and Their Angels" as well as "Making Friends" about Katya from Moscow and Star from San Francisco; two eleven-year-old girls. Her most recent book, a memoir titled Peeing on Hot Coals, was released in 2014.

Humanitarian works
Montandon is an activist for women's rights, and in 1970, she founded The Name Choice Center to advocate for women's right to keep their own name after marriage.

In 1982, Montandon founded a peace group, Children as Teachers for Peace (later renamed Children as the Peacemakers). Montandon has made 37 international trips with grade-school children. She has had meetings with 26 world leaders such as China's Premier Zhao Ziyang, Chancellor Helmut Kohl, Pope John Paul II, the late Indira Gandhi, Prime Minister Gro Harlem Brundtland of Norway, former Soviet President Mikhail Gorbachev, and Mother Teresa. She collects letters written by schoolchildren urging an end to nuclear proliferation, and has delivered food and supplies to children in Russia and Ethiopia.

In 1987, Montandon designed the Banner of Hope. Now a mile long, the  memorial is inscribed with the names and ages of children killed in war. The Banner was first exhibited in the Kremlin at an International Women's Congress.

In 2018, Montandon renamed her organization Peace To The Planet. The organization aims to provide children with a platform to advocate against gun violence and global warming. Peace To The Planet is completing a new banner, similar to the Banner of Hope, showing the faces and names of children killed in gun violence.

Awards and honors
Montandon was nominated for a Nobel Peace Prize three successive years and received the UN Peace Messenger award in 1987.

In 2014, Dr. Jitu Rajgor, founded a women’s health facility in Montandon's honor at his clinic in Ahmedabad, India.

Personal life
Montandon was married three times. Her first marriage, to Howard Groves in 1947, lasted 12 years. In the 1960s, she had a short-lived marriage to attorney Melvin Belli.

In 1969, she married butter baron and billionaire Al Wilsey, and the next year she had her only child, best-selling author Sean Wilsey. As a society wife, Montandon "acquired a reputation for giving the best parties and round-table luncheons." Al Wilsey later had an affair with Montandon's married best friend, Dede Traina (born Diane Dow Buchanan), before he filed for divorce in 1980 in order to marry Dede. The divorce proceedings played out publicly.

In 1975, Montandon won a lawsuit against Triangle Publications for supposedly damaging her reputation.

In popular culture
Author Armistead Maupin caricatured her as society columnist "Prue Giroux" in his Tales of the City series.

Published works
How to Be A Party Girl, McGraw-Hill, 1968.
The Intruders, 1975.
Making Friends
Celebrities And Their Angels
 Oh the Hell of it All, Harper, 2007.
 Whispers from God: A Life Beyond Imaginings, Harper Paperbacks, 2008.
Peeing On Hot Coals
Recipes for Conversation: A Guide to Hosting Authentic Conversations in the Digital Age (and a Pandemic)

Notes

References 

Living people
American non-fiction writers
Writers from San Francisco
1928 births
American socialites
American women non-fiction writers
21st-century American women